Gomphrena pohlii is a plant native to Cerrado vegetation in Brazil, specially in São Paulo. This plant is cited in Flora Brasiliensis  by Carl Friedrich Philipp von Martius.

References

pohlii
Flora of Brazil
Flora of the Cerrado